Margherita Hack  (12 June 1922 – 29 June 2013) was an Italian astrophysicist and scientific disseminator. The asteroid 8558 Hack, discovered in 1995, was named in her honour.

Biography
Hack was born in Florence. Her father Roberto Hack was a Florentine bookkeeper of Protestant Swiss origin. Her mother, Maria Luisa Poggesi, a Catholic from Tuscany, was a graduate of the Accademia di Belle Arti di Firenze and a miniaturist at the Uffizi Gallery. Both parents left their religion to join the Italian Theosophical Society, for which Roberto Hack was secretary for a time under the chairmanship of the countess Gamberini-Cavallini.

An athlete in her youth, Hack played basketball and competed in track and field during the National University Contests, called the Littoriali under Mussolini's fascist regime, where she won the long jump and the high jump events. She married Aldo De Rosa on 19 February 1944 in the church of San Leonardo in Arcetri; De Rosa had been one of her childhood playmates.

Hack attended the Liceo Classico "Galileo Galilei" in Florence, but the outbreak of World War II prevented her from taking her exams. In 1945, she received a degree in physics from the University of Florence with a final score of 101/110; her thesis in astrophysics was on Cepheid variables, based on her studies in the  Arcetri Observatory, then under the direction of Giorgio Abetti. Hack considered Abetti her model for a scientist, teacher, and scientific research centre administrator.

In Italy, Hack was known for her anti-religious views and her continual criticism of the Catholic Church and of its hierarchy and institutions. She was a vegetarian from childhood and supported animal welfare. She wrote a book explaining this choice entitled Perché sono vegetariana (Why I Am A Vegetarian); she also wrote a book entitled La mia vita in bicicletta (My life on a bicycle).

Hack died on 29 June 2013 at 4:30 am at Cattinara Hospital in Trieste. She had been hospitalized for a week for heart problems, from which she had suffered for about two years. She had refused to have heart surgery. Hack's husband, Aldo De Rosa, died on 26 September 2014, due to complications of the Alzheimer disease. They both rest in the cemetery of Sant'Anna in Trieste. Hack left her personal library, containing 18,000 books on astronomy, to the city of Trieste.

On 12 June 2021, Google celebrated her with Google Doodle on her 99th birthday. 

In June 2022, to celebrate the 100th anniversary of her birth, a statue of Margherita Hack was placed in front of the Università Statale di Milano. The bronze statue titled Sguardo Fisico is by the artist Daniela Olivieri (who is known as Sissi) who teaches at the Accademia di Belle Arti di Firenze. This is the first statue of a woman scientist to stand on public ground in Italy donated by Fondazione Deloitte.

Scientific activity
She was full professor of astronomy at the University of Trieste from 1964 to the 1st of November 1992, when Hack was placed "out of role" for seniority. She has been the first Italian woman to administrate the Trieste Astronomical Observatory from 1964 to 1987, bringing it to international fame.

Member of the most physics and astronomy associations, Margherita Hack was also director of the Astronomy Department at the University of Trieste from 1985 to 1991 and from 1994 to 1997. She was a member of the Accademia Nazionale dei Lincei (national member in the class of mathematical physics and natural sciences; second category: astronomy, geodesic, geophysics and applications; section A: astronomy and applications). She worked at many American and European observatories and was for long time member of working groups of ESA and NASA. In Italy, with an intensive promotion work, she obtained the growth of activity of the astronomical community with access to several satellites, reaching a notoriety of international level.

Hack has published several original papers in international journals and several books both of popular science and university level. In 1994 she was awarded with the Targa Giuseppe Piazzi for the scientific research, and in 1995 with the Cortina Ulisse Prize for scientific dissemination.

In 1978, Margherita Hack founded the bimonthly magazine L'Astronomia, whose first issue came out in November 1979; later, together with Corrado Lamberti, she directed the magazine of popular science and astronomy culture Le Stelle.

Social and political activity

Hack was also known for her activities outside of science, especially in the social and political fields.

She was an atheist and she did not believe in any religion or form of supernaturalism. Hack also believed that ethics does not derive from religion, but from "principles of conscience" that allow anyone to have a secular view of life, respectful of other people's individuality and freedom.

Hostile to any form of superstition, including pseudosciences, Hack was a scientific guarantor of CICAP since 1989 and an honorary president of the Union of Rationalist Atheists and Agnostics (UAAR). In 2005, she joined Luca Coscioni Association for the freedom of scientific research. She has been a member of the Transnational Radical Party.

Hack stood for Italian regional elections of 2005 in Lombardy in the list of the Party of Italian Communists obtaining 5,364 votes in the province of Milan. After the election, she gave her seat to Bebo Storti. She sided again with the Party of Italian Communists in the 2006 Italian general election. She was nominated for several districts of the Chamber of Deputies, but she decided to give the seat up to devote herself to astronomy.

On 22 October 2008, during a student demonstration in Piazza della Signoria in Florence, Hack gave a lecture on astrophysics touching on the experiments carried out at the CERN about the Higgs boson, after a discussion against the law 133/08 (which previously was the law-decree 112, called "Tremonti decree"). On the 21st of January 2009 she became a candidate of the Anti-capitalist List for the European Elections of June. She wasn't elected because the list didn't reach the 4% threshold. In November 2009, through an open letter on the MicroMega magazine, she criticized the Italian President of the Council, Silvio Berlusconi, on the matter of legal actions in which he was involved in and his alleged attempt to elude them.

During the regional elections of 2010, Hack was running with the Federazione della Sinistra and she was elected in the Rome district with over 7000 votes. During the first Council meeting she resigned leaving the seat to the other list's candidates. In October 2012 she declared her endorsement for Nichi Vendola during the left wing primary elections, whereas during the following ballot she sided for Matteo Renzi against Pierluigi Bersani.

In April 2013, Hack joined the "Emma Bonino committee" together with other eminent Italian figures, such as Renzo Arbore, Toni Garrani, Anna Fendi, Alessandro Pace, Stefano Disegni in order to promote Emma Bonino's candidacy as Italian President of the Republic.

Supporting nuclear research 
Regarding the energy issue, Margherita Hack spoke against the construction of nuclear power stations in Italy, but in favour of nuclear research, explaining that Italy was not at that time able to maintain nuclear reactors and that Italy is a scarcely reliable country.

Awards and decorations

Selected publications

C'è qualcuno là fuori? (with Viviano Domenici, 2015)
Hack! Come io vedo il mondo (2013)
Nove vite come i gatti (with Federico Taddia, 2013)
Vi racconto l'astronomia (2013)
Il Mio Infinito (2011)
La mia vita in bicicletta (2011)
Perché sono vegetariana (2011)
Dove nascono le stelle (2004)
Nebulae and Galaxies (with Giorgio Abetti, 1964)

References

External links

1922 births
2013 deaths
20th-century Italian astronomers
20th-century Italian women scientists
21st-century Italian astronomers
Italian anti-capitalists
Italian astrophysicists
Italian atheists
Italian communists
Italian people of Swiss descent
Italian science writers
Italian vegetarianism activists
Scientists from Florence
Women astronomers
Women astrophysicists